Wizardry: Labyrinth of Lost Souls is a video game developed by Acquire and published by Xseed Games for the PlayStation 3, PlayStation Vita, iOS, and Microsoft Windows. Although the Wizardry series was originally developed in the US by Sir-Tech, it has been kept alive in Japan by various developers. The dungeon-crawling role-playing game franchise hadn't been seen in the West since 2001's duo of Wizardry 8 for Windows and Wizardry: Tale of the Forsaken Land for the PlayStation 2.

Reception

The game received "mixed" reviews on all platforms according to the review aggregation website Metacritic. IGN criticized the PlayStation 3 version for making players put in large amounts of work and not rewarding them enough. GameSpot criticized the same console version's old fashioned design and (erroneously) claimed it lacked an automap feature, but praised its challenging and addictive combat. GamePro said, "Ultimately, 'Lost Souls' will reward masochists and scare off anyone intimidated by the slightest bit of a learning curve. There's a great challenge in store, but it doesn't pull any punches or make any apologies. Know that going in and don't say you weren't warned."

Windows version 
Scheduled for release on May 29, 2019 for Microsoft Windows via Steam, Xseed Games announced that day that the game would not be released as originally scheduled due to unforeseen IP licensing issues. Eventually, the release date was solidified as January 15, 2020.

References

External links
 Official Japanese Website
 Official English Website
 
 

2009 video games
Fantasy video games
First-person party-based dungeon crawler video games
IOS games
PlayStation 3 games
PlayStation Network games
PlayStation Vita games
Role-playing video games
Video games developed in Japan
Video games featuring protagonists of selectable gender
Windows games
Wizardry
Xseed Games games
Acquire (company) games